The 1940 United States Senate election in Michigan was held on November 5, 1940.

Republican Senator Arthur Vandenberg was re-elected to a third consecutive term over Democratic judge Frank FitzGerald.

Republican primary

Candidates
Bowen R. Gover, perennial candidate
Arthur Vandenberg, incumbent Senator since 1928

Results

Democratic primary

Candidates
Sid A. Erwin
Frank FitzGerald, Wayne County Circuit Court Commissioner
Michael J. Hart, U.S. Representative from Saginaw
Ralph W. Liddy
Louis B. Ward, editor of Social Justice and candidate for Senate in 1936

Results

General election

Results

See also 
 1940 United States Senate elections

References 

1940
Michigan
United States Senate